The following is a list of terrorist incidents that have not been carried out by a state or its forces (see state terrorism and state-sponsored terrorism). Assassinations are listed at List of assassinated people.

Definitions of terrorism vary, so incidents listed here are restricted to those that are notable and described as "terrorism" by a consensus of reliable sources.

Pre-1800
Scholars dispute what might be called terrorism in earlier periods. The modern sense of terrorism emerged in the mid-19th century.

1800–1899

1900–1929

1930–1949

 1936–1939: 1936–1939 Arab revolt, Palestine Arab "gang and terrorist activities" against British colonial rule, and Jewish immigrants.
 1937–1948: The Irgun are responsible for numerous attacks in British-mandated Palestine.
 1940, 3 March: Politically motivated bombing targeted at the communist newspaper Norrskensflamman (Northern Flame) by various perpetrators. 5 persons were killed, 2 of which were children, along with 5 others injured.
 1940–1956: George Metesky, the "Mad Bomber", places over 30 bombs in New York City in public places such as Grand Central Terminal and The Paramount Theater, injuring ten during this period, in protest against the local electric utility. He also sends many threatening letters.
 1940, 4 July: Time bomb is recovered from the British Pavilion at the 1939 New York World's Fair, two policemen were killed.
  1946, 22 July: The King David Hotel bombing by Zionist paramilitary group Irgun kills 91 and injures 46 non-fatally.
 1947, 25 July: Three Romanian terrorists kill an aircrew member aboard a Romanian airliner. This is regarded as the first aircraft hijack resulting in a fatality.
  1948, 22 February, Ben Yehuda Street bombings: three British Army trucks led by an armoured car driven by Arab irregulars and British deserters exploded on Ben Yehuda Street killing 58 Jewish civilians and injuring 140.
 1949, 7 May: thirteen people are killed as a Philippine airliner explodes in flight travelling from Daet to Manila. A time bomb detonates 30 minutes after departure near Alabat Island.
 1949, 5 August: 12 killed and dozens injured in the Menarsha synagogue attack, Damascus.

1950–1969
  1954, 17 March: an Israeli civilian passenger bus is attacked by unknown assailants at the Scorpions Pass in the Negev, resulting in the deaths of eleven passengers.
 Cyprus 1956, 16 June: The United States vice consul is killed and six other consulate staff are injured when a terrorist throws 2 bombs in a restaurant in Nicosia.
 1957, 30 November: 10 killed and 48 injured in a grenade attack on President Sukarno.
 1958, 15 August: Three people are killed in a bomb blast in Beirut. The bombing also injures ten more at a grocery store near the Lebanese Parliament.
 1960, 24 June: Attempted assassination of President Rómulo Betancourt.
 1962, 22 November: Members of the Pan Africanist Congress' military wing, Poqo targeted the town of Paarl in the Western Cape, when a crowd of over 200 people armed with axes, pangas and other home-made weapons marched from the Mbekweni township into Paarl and attacked the police station, homes and shops. Two white residents and 5 attackers were killed. Poqo directed its activities at the white population in general. It was also Poqo's avowed policy to attack and kill Black people who were some way or another linked to the apartheid state.
 1963–1970: Front de libération du Québec (FLQ) committed frequent bombings targeting English businesses and banks, as well as McGill University. The whole bombing campaign resulted in 8 known deaths and numerous injuries.
 1963, 29 August: The Tacuara Nationalist Movement robbed a bank, stealing almost 100,000 US dollars. 2 people died and 3 were injured. 
 1963, 15 September, 16th Street Baptist Church bombing –  Four members of the Ku Klux Klan planted at least 15 sticks of dynamite attached to a timing device beneath the front steps of the church. The explosion killed 4 girls and wounded 22.
 1965, 26 June: Two simultaneous explosions took place near a restaurant in the 1965 Saigon bombing during the Vietnam War. The attack killed 42 people and 80 were wounded.
  1966: The 1966 anti-Igbo pogrom was a series of massacres committed against Igbos and other people of southern Nigerian origin living in northern Nigeria starting in May 1966 and reaching a peak after 29 September 1966. Between 8,000 and 30,000 Igbos and easterners have been estimated to have been killed. A further 1 million Igbos fled the Northern Region into the East. These events led to the secession of the eastern Nigerian region and the declaration of the Republic of Biafra, which ultimately led to the Nigeria-Biafra war.
 Greece 1967, 12 November: A bomb explodes on board Cyprus Airways Flight 284 near Rhodes killing all 66 people on the aircraft.
 / 1966, 28–29 September: a group of militant Argentine nationalists hijacked a civilian Aerolineas Argentinas aircraft while flying over Puerto Santa Cruz and forced the captain at gunpoint to land in the Falkland Islands, where they took several civilians hostage. The crisis was resolved 36 hours later when the hijackers agreed to release their hostages and return to Argentina for trial.
  1968, 4 September: Three bombs are detonated in Tel Aviv, killing one person and injuring 51 people.
  1969, 21–25 February: Three separate bombings in Jerusalem, one in the British Consulate and two in a supermarket. In one of the bombings at the supermarket two Israelis were killed and in all attacks 20 were injured. One of the terrorist involved was Rasmea Odeh.
  Ireland 1969, 5 August: A bomb was detonated in Dublin at the main studio of the state broadcaster, RTÉ. The Protestant extremist group the UVF were responsible. No one was injured.
  Ireland 1969 A UPV suicide bomber attacked a power station in Ballyshannon, County Donegal. There were no casualties other than the attacker. The UVF issued a statement saying the attempted attack was a protest against the Irish Army units "still massed on the border in Co Donegal". The statement added: "so long as the threats from Éire continue, so long will the volunteers of Ulster's people's army strike at targets in Southern Ireland".
  Ireland 1969, 31 October: The UVF bombed a monument in Bodenstown, Dublin, dedicated to the Irish Republican hero Wolfe Tone. There were no injuries.
  1969, 12 December: Piazza Fontana bombing in Milan kills at least thirteen people and injures at least 85. Three additional blasts occur in Rome, injuring 16 people.
  Ireland 1969, 26 December: The UVF bombed the Daniel O'Connell monument in Dublin. There were no injuries but buildings were damaged in a half mile radius.
  Ireland 1969, 28 December: The UVF detonate a bomb outside the Garda central detective bureau in Dublin. The nearby telephone exchange headquarters is suspected to have been the target.

1970–present

 List of terrorist incidents in 1970
 List of terrorist incidents in 1971
 List of terrorist incidents in 1972
 List of terrorist incidents in 1973
 List of terrorist incidents in 1974
 List of terrorist incidents in 1975
 List of terrorist incidents in 1976
 List of terrorist incidents in 1977
 List of terrorist incidents in 1978
 List of terrorist incidents in 1979
 List of terrorist incidents in 1980
 List of terrorist incidents in 1981
 List of terrorist incidents in 1982
 List of terrorist incidents in 1983
 List of terrorist incidents in 1984
 List of terrorist incidents in 1985
 List of terrorist incidents in 1986
 List of terrorist incidents in 1987
 List of terrorist incidents in 1988
 List of terrorist incidents in 1989
 List of terrorist incidents in 1990
 List of terrorist incidents in 1991
 List of terrorist incidents in 1992
 List of terrorist incidents in 1993
 List of terrorist incidents in 1994
 List of terrorist incidents in 1995
 List of terrorist incidents in 1996
 List of terrorist incidents in 1997
 List of terrorist incidents in 1998
 List of terrorist incidents in 1999
 List of terrorist incidents in 2000
 List of terrorist incidents in 2001
 List of terrorist incidents in 2002
 List of terrorist incidents in 2003
 List of terrorist incidents in 2004
 List of terrorist incidents in 2005
 List of terrorist incidents in 2006
 List of terrorist incidents in 2007
 List of terrorist incidents in 2008
 List of terrorist incidents in 2009
 List of terrorist incidents in 2010
 List of terrorist incidents in 2011
 List of terrorist incidents in 2012
 List of terrorist incidents in 2013
 List of terrorist incidents in 2014
 List of terrorist incidents in 2015
 List of terrorist incidents in 2016
 List of terrorist incidents in 2017
 List of terrorist incidents in 2018
 List of terrorist incidents in 2019
 List of terrorist incidents in 2020
 List of terrorist incidents in 2021
 List of terrorist incidents in 2022
 List of terrorist incidents in 2023

By country

 List of terrorist incidents in Australia
 List of terrorist incidents in Denmark
 List of terrorist incidents in France
 List of terrorist incidents in Great Britain
 List of terrorist incidents in India
 List of terrorist incidents in Indonesia
 List of terrorist incidents in Iraq
 List of terrorist incidents in the Netherlands
 List of terrorist incidents in North Macedonia
 List of terrorist incidents in Pakistan
 List of terrorist incidents in the Philippines
 List of terrorist incidents in Saudi Arabia
 List of non-state terrorist incidents in Sri Lanka
 List of terrorist incidents in Syria
 List of terrorist incidents in Tunisia
 Terrorism in Argentina
 Terrorism in Australia
 Terrorism in Azerbaijan
 Terrorism in Brazil
 Terrorist activity in Belgium
 Terrorism in Bangladesh
 Terrorism in Burkina Faso
 Terrorism in Colombia
 Terrorism in Canada
 Terrorism in China
 Terrorism in Chile
 Terrorism in Denmark
 Terrorism in Egypt
 Terrorism in Ecuador
 Terrorism in France
 Terrorism in Germany
 Terrorism in Greece
 Terrorism in India
 Terrorism in Indonesia
 Assassination and terrorism in Iran
 :Category:Terrorism in Iraq
 Terrorism in Italy
 Terrorism in Jamaica
 Terrorism in Kenya
 Terrorism in Kuwait
 Terrorism and counterterrorism in Kazakhstan
 Terrorism in Kyrgyzstan
 Terrorism in Malaysia
 Terrorism in Morocco
 Terrorism in Myanmar
 Terrorism in Mexico
 Terrorism in Norway
 Terrorism in New Zealand
 Terrorism in Pakistan
 Terrorism in the Philippines
 Terrorism in Russia
 Terrorism in Syria
 Terrorism in South Africa
 Terrorism in Somalia
 Terrorism in Sudan
 Terrorism in Serbia
 Terrorism in Sri Lanka
 Terrorism in Saudi Arabia
 Terrorism in Spain
 Terrorism in Sweden
 Terrorism in Switzerland
 Terrorism in Turkey
 Terrorism in Tajikistan
 Terrorism in Uzbekistan
 Crime in Ukraine#Terrorism
 Terrorism in Uganda
 Terrorism in the United Arab Emirates
 Terrorism in the United Kingdom
 Terrorism in the United States
 Terrorism in Yemen

See also
State terrorism
Domestic terrorism
Communist terrorism
Cyberterrorism
Economic terrorism
Environmental terrorism
Left-wing terrorism
Misogynist terrorism
Narcoterrorism
Nuclear terrorism
Right-wing terrorism
 List of right-wing terrorist attacks

Terrorism in Europe
Religious terrorism
Christian terrorism
Islamic terrorism
Islamic terrorism in Europe
Jewish religious terrorism
Saffron terror
Number of terrorist incidents by country
List of major terrorist incidents
List of aircraft hijackings
List of assassinations
List of bus attacks
List of designated terrorist groups
List of events named massacres
List of incidents of political violence in Washington, D.C.
List of mass car bombings
Lists of nuclear disasters and radioactive incidents
List of marauding terrorist incidents

References

External links
U.S. National Counterterrorism Center's Worldwide Incidents Tracking System
Fatal Terrorist Attacks in Israel since the Declaration of Principles (September 1993) to September 2000
 Assassination of Liaquat Ali Khan: Documents from the U.S. National Archives
 
 History of Terrorism : Timeline of Terrorist Acts – Chronology
 Thinkquest: Timeline of Terror
 Infoplease: Terrorist Attacks on Americans
 Infoplease: Terrorist Attacks (within the United States or against Americans abroad)
 Frontline : Terrorist Attacks on Americans
PBS Frontline/New York Times "Al Qaeda's New Front" Chronology of significant plots uncovered in Europe both before and after 9/11. January 2004
"Ephéméride Anarchiste" Listing anarchist terrorist incidents in France, or others countries. In French.
Selected terrorist incidents worldwide, through September 2000: complied by Wm. Robert Johnston

incidents